Dehlon is a sub tehsil located in the Ludhiana ,  of Ludhiana district, Punjab.

Administration
The village is administrated by a Sarpanch who is an elected representative of village as per constitution of India and Panchayati raj (India).

Villages in Ludhiana East Tehsil

References

External links
  Villages in Ludhiana East Tehsil

Villages in Ludhiana East tehsil